Andrew Coelho (born 2 October 1987) is a retired professional Australian tennis player.

Coelho's highest ATP singles ranking is World No. 281, which he reached on 3 November 2008.  His career high in doubles was at 207 set at 5 November 2007.

ATP Challenger and ITF Futures finals

Singles: 6 (4–2)

Doubles: 15 (9–6)

References

External links
 
 
 

1987 births
Living people
Australian male tennis players
Australian people of Portuguese descent
Tennis players from Melbourne
20th-century Australian people
21st-century Australian people